The Mariscal Caceres National Forest (Spanish mariscal marshal) is situated in the Mariscal Cáceres Province of Peru.

It is subject to deforestation. A 1995 projection was that 2.17% of the area was deforested and by 2000 2.55% would be.

References

National forests of Peru
Geography of San Martín Region